The XXIII Reserve Corps was a corps level command of the German Army in World War I.

Formation 
XXIII Reserve Corps was formed in October 1914. It was part of the first wave of new Corps formed at the outset of World War I consisting of XXII - XXVII Reserve Corps of 43rd - 54th Reserve Divisions (plus 6th Bavarian Reserve Division). It was dissolved on 12 August 1918.

Structure on formation 
On formation in October 1914, XXIII Reserve Corps consisted of two divisions. but was weaker than an Active Corps
Reserve Infantry Regiments consisted of three battalions but only had a machine gun platoon (of 2 machine guns) rather than a machine gun company (of 6 machine guns)
Reserve Jäger Battalions did not have a machine gun company on formation, though some were provided with a machine gun platoon
Reserve Cavalry Detachments were much smaller than the Reserve Cavalry Regiments formed on mobilisation
Reserve Field Artillery Regiments consisted of three  (2 gun and 1 howitzer) of three batteries each, but each battery had just 4 guns (rather than 6 of the Active and the Reserve Regiments formed on mobilisation)

In summary, XXIII Reserve Corps mobilised with 26 infantry battalions, 8 machine gun platoons (16 machine guns), 2 cavalry detachments, 18 field artillery batteries (72 guns) and 2 pioneer companies.

Commanders 
XXIII Reserve Corps had the following commanders during its existence:

See also

References

Bibliography 
 
 
 
 
 

Corps of Germany in World War I
Military units and formations established in 1914
Military units and formations disestablished in 1918